Chamutete is a town in southern Angola.  Chamutete is also spelled Techamutete.  It lies in Huíla Province.

Transport 

It is currently terminus for a branch railway from Dongo on the Southern Railway system.  In 2007, talks between Angola and Namibia were considering the interlinking of their respective railways with a line passing through Chamutete, and Oshikango on the border. The central and northern systems would remain to be linked.

See also 
 Cassinga
 Railway stations in Angola
 Transport in Angola

References 

Populated places in Huíla Province